Sean Landers (born 1962) is an American artist. He is best known for using his personal experience as public subject matter and for utilizing diverse styles and media in a performative manner, and is especially known for his word art. His work encompasses many media: painting, sculpture, photography, drawing, writing, video and audio, and he uses humor and confession, gravity and pathos in it, blurring the lines between fact and fiction, reality and fantasy, sincerity and insincerity.

Landers lives and works in New York City

Early life and education

Landers was born in Springfield and raised in Palmer, Massachusetts in 1962. He learned to paint from his mother, Diana George Landers, and grandmother, Muriel Brown George, who studied under the American painter Jonas Joseph LaValley.

Landers received a BFA in sculpture from the Philadelphia College of Art in 1984 and an MFA in sculpture from Yale University School of Art in 1986.

Work

Early work (1991–1994)

Landers's formative body of work, produced from 1991-1994, is one that defined the artist, the persona, and the conceptual constructs that he has cultivated and enriched over the course of his career.

Beginning in 1990, Landers began to use writing as a visual media and exhibited a body of hand-written work titled Art, Life and God, featuring an alter-ego named Chris Hamson, an amalgam of Landers and his artist friends. Written on yellow legal pads of paper, partly in screenplay format and partly as exemplar writing in which Hamson is the “author/artist”, the work gives voice to the inside of the artist’s head as it takes the viewer into the world of a young struggling artist in New York City. With each scene Landers weaves a tightly knit world where fact and fiction are blurred, and the intensely personal is obscured by the persona of Chris Hamson. Landers has said, “When I saw the magnetism of the writing, it became the material with which I could work.” With its roots planted firmly in the performative, which has remained at the core of his artistic practice ever since, Landers chose to make his life, and the actual act of making the work, the subject of his work. Much of this body of work is compiled in an artist book titled Art, Life and God, published in 2009 by Glenn Horowitz Bookseller.

Landers considers these early writings, and subsequent writings, to be drawings for which the text is the image. This early work is considered by the artist to be the backbone of his entire oeuvre and throughout his career he has consistently mined this trove in his re-examination of the art-making practice.

Landers views an entire installation of his work as the greater artwork, composed of individual works that are meant to stand alone but conceived of as part of the whole. This concept adds another layer of meaning to the idea of multi-media. The written drawings were always taped to the exhibition walls and shown with sculptures installed in the center of the room. Made out of wet terracotta clay, with each show, the sculptures progressed from “Hamson’s” which were “shamefully” shown and obscured with black trash bags over them to ones made by Landers as “Landers”. These wet sculptures needed to be sprayed to be kept alive during the exhibition and at show’s end only those that sold would be cast into bronze; a metaphor for art that survives is art that is loved and cared for.

For Landers, video was an integral part of these multi-media installations and provided another performative basis from which to view the show as a whole. He used video to reinforce a fundamental component of the unspoken communication between art and the viewer, and equally, artist and the viewer. Shot in the studio, in which the artist takes a central role, intimate revelations on the part of the artist make the viewer implicit in the action, and a de facto voyeur-accomplice, leading to the viewer’s own self-recognition and subsequent evaluation. As Landers said, “The idea was to let viewers into my studio, as an extension of my head, to be with me as I was making stuff. In this process, even dancing with an umbrella became ‘making stuff’.” The video itself becomes self-referential, and records the time spent making its existence a reality. Landers’s videos anticipated reality television, as well as YouTube.

For his 1992 exhibition at Andrea Rosen Gallery in New York, Landers exhibited a variety of work shedding Chris Hamson and “unveiling” the artist. Ranging from diaristic calendars, and confessional ranting letters to his student loan officer, to stream-of-consciousness writing on large-scale paper, and cartoons of art-world stereotypes, all of which exposed his inner-most thoughts, it became apparent that the subject matter of Landers’s work had shifted to Landers, and he himself became the object of study. By peering into his life, or what he chose to present of it, viewers were once again invited to become a voyeur. As Roberta Smith wrote in her New York Times review of the exhibition, “taken as a whole, the current show creates a feeling of voyeuristic intimacy…his work draws a vivid picture…of both the artworld and the psychic process of art-making itself. While highly specialized, it is also widely accessible, in part because Mr. Landers deals with so many basic human emotions.” As Landers said, “I knew that was why people would endure aching feet to read my art, because while staring into my open soul they were actually evaluating themselves. I think this is a fundamental component of the unspoken communication between art and viewer.”

First exhibited as artwork in the Aperto section of the Venice Biennale in 1993, and then published later that year as a limited edition book by Publicsfear Press, [sic] was the culmination of the previous written drawings in their entirety. More autobiographical than ever, and at over 400 pages, it blurred fact and fiction, art and life, and invited comparisons with Samuel Beckett and his novel Molloy. Jeffrey Deitch in his 1996 catalogue essay for the Young Americans: New Art at the Saatchi Collection writes, “The reader becomes drawn into Landers’s mind…one has entered into his consciousness and feels as though inside his mind looking out rather than outside his mind looking in.” Feeling completely overexposed by his own hand and needing a place to hide, Landers moved to writing on giant pieces of unstretched linen. So large they were impossible to read in a linear fashion, similar to the experience of viewing his earlier large-scale drawings, of which Roberta Smith wrote in The New York Times, made “reading on foot an essential part of the experience…as one ranges over [them], reading up and down more often than across, one has the sensation of eavesdropping on Mr Landers’s monologue, and this adds a second layer of stream-of-consciousness to the work.” These first early paintings, much like the work that preceded them, were performative renderings and records of the exact thoughts the artist had at the point of their creation; an immediate narrative produced in real time. The choice of unstretched linen was a conscious one – their physical form referenced the paper of the drawings that preceding them. The medium of oil on linen immediately gave them a link to traditional art-making practices and it guaranteed the immortality of the words and the artist. “..That’s why I stopped writing on paper and started writing on lead primed linen…I wanted it to last. That’s behind my impulse to make art. I wanted it to last, to outlast me.” During this time Landers experimented with patches of writing on paintings, rather than narrative form stream-of-conscience writing. These patches were designed to actively entertain the viewer in order to prevent them from moving on, and gave them the illusion of piecing together the persona of the artist through his snippets of writings, while denying them the full-picture entirely.

With this early body of work, Landers “foretold the mass-market deaccessioning of private moments, a movement that also includes tweeting, status updates and a lengthening index of user names.”

In 1994 Landers moved further into the realm of a more traditional and less overtly conceptual form of picture making by using oblique references to Picabia, an artist who Landers admired for maintaining his creative freedom. Throughout the course of his career, Landers has gone back to Picabia, specifically his spoof of abstraction, the painting “7091”, as a touchstone. Rather than copying Picabia’s look, Landers quotes him obliquely and uses him as a symbol for his own artistic freedom, which he views as essential for his survival. Landers was now using his writing to create forms – large-scale doodles with different colored text. He also started to insert imagery into his paintings among the writing. Most importantly, this is when the chimp and clown first appear in his artwork. These two characters can be considered as surrogates for the aspects of the artist’s personality as they manifest the highs and lows characteristic of his writing; the chimp representing self-aggrandizement and the clown representing self-abasement. During this time Landers started to investigate the use of color while taking a needed break from writing by making colorful stripe paintings which were completely devoid of text.

Moving into imagery (1996– )
In 1996 Landers moved completely into the realm of imagery. The painting Alone (1996), depicts a diminutive impasto clown in an insufficient rowboat in a vast seascape, invoking Manet’s Rochefort’s Escape. This clown, by replacing the text-as-imagery in his previous paintings, now embodied the innermost thoughts of the artist. Landers went on to paint a series of purely image paintings – clowns in perilous conditions of nature, meant to be allegorical of his new journey into the uncharted territories of painting.

It was also during this time that Landers began his monthly back-page column, “Genius Lessons”, in Spin magazine. The column ran from 1996 to 2000.

Landers began to tell the story of his life through paintings and used art history to do it. In 1996 he based an entire series of thirteen paintings on a William Hogarth painting, A Midnight Modern Conversation (1732). This autobiographical series told the story of growing up and of outgrowing the drinking-based camaraderie on which he and his friends had subsisted for so long. Landers remembers a “distinct sense of liberation on completing these works and credits them with opening up a range of possibilities for non-text based work, including narrative painting, in the broadest sense which he continues to explore today.” This body of work has been exhibited the most of any body of Landers’s work and was most recently the subject of a solo exhibition at Marianne Boesky Gallery in New York in 2011, accompanied by a fully illustrated catalogue with essay.

In 1997, continuing to represent his life and self though imagery, he presented paintings that were an amalgam of two or three art historical paintings done in a Disney-like cartoon style. For Landers, the Disney influence was important because it represented the collective unconscious of imagery for people raised in the Baby Boom era and forward. By referencing Matisse, Poussin, Homer, Gericault and Disney, he was comparing himself in order to “illustrate my or any artist’s predicament of trying to make ‘new’ art in the wake of art history, and more specifically, in the wake of my generation’s art education, which was dominated by theory, conceptual art, minimalism and process art. These shows were my humble effort to reinsert form back into conceptual art…. It was a conceptual art act that was anti-conceptual.”

1997–2000
Returning to writing for his psychological survival, Landers turned to Magritte’s Vache period for his inspiration and found painterly freedom once again. For the first time, the image came to the fore and the writing became the support structure. As Landers said, “all of my vache figures are… an extension of my clown language.” Landers used automatic drawing techniques of the Surrealists to form the image, which was never preconceived, “I’d pick up my brush and I’d paint a cartoon in the middle of a canvas, not like it, wipe it off, and repeat that process ten to twenty times…often with that many ghosts of old drawings a new drawing begins to emerge.” The majority of the paintings in this series were made between 1997 and 2000.

Landers sees twentieth-century art as divided by the art of Picasso, who typifies the traditional painterly vein – an artist sitting in front of a blank canvas, and Duchamp, the grandfather of conceptual art. During the time of 2000 to 2003, Landers made paintings that melded various aspects of both artists to create a body of work that typified each. Both Picasso and Duchamp used borrowed imagery; Picasso from other artists such as Rembrandt, Velásquez and Delacroix to announce his belief that he belonged among their history, while Duchamp introduced the idea of the “ready-made”. Landers said “therefore, borrowing another’s imagery can be seen as ‘ready-made'.” For example, when he used Picasso’s imagery to spell his first name, and the word “genius”, he “was using Duchamp to riff on Picasso, melding them together to describe myself and my situation as an artist.” Around this time Landers made three performative audio pieces, The Man Within (2000), Dear Picasso (2001), and Becoming Great (2002), designed to be played during the three solo exhibitions they were made for. As with his other mediums, he “ just picked up the microphone, switched into character and let it rip."

During this period, Landers went on to continue to pay homage to Duchamp and Picasso as well as other artists with which he shares a personal affinity, Picabia, Magritte, Dalí, De Chirico, Braque, Beckmann, and Ernst by depicting them either as clowns or as ghosts. Landers said, “Painting someone as a clown is putting them in my pantheon, you know? It’s not an insult. Painting them as a ghost is similar. So I was communicating with Max Ernst, and Picabia. But there was another level, too. What I like about the Surrealists is that they are guys who would sit in front of a blank canvas and allow their stream-of-consciousness to in some way fill the emptiness. Which is exactly what I am doing when I fill a giant empty white canvas with text...but in a different way.”

Text and image (2003–2008)

From 2003 to 2008, Landers looked back to his old text paintings, took their graphic nature and exploded it into spatial abstract paintings. “We’ve entered his skull conceptually and visually. Words and phrases ricochet off the walls of his cranium and we are among the brushstrokes.” These paintings have an echoing look where “thoughts emerge in your brain, they become clear and then recede back into the blurry distance.” “I was just trying to give thought a picture.”

Exhibitions

Survey exhibitions of Landers’s work have been presented at Contemporary Art Museum St Louis (2010) and Kunsthalle Zurich (2004). His work has also been seen in exhibitions at MoMA/PS1, New York; Whitney Museum of American Art, New York; Massachusetts Museum of Contemporary Art, North Adams; Contemporary Arts Museum Houston; Serpentine Gallery, London; Saatchi Gallery, London; Kunsthalle Vienna; Kunstverein in Hamburg; Musée d’Art Contemporain de Bordeaux; Rebecca Camhi Gallery, Athens and the Venice Biennale, Athens Biennale and Berlin Biennial.

A comprehensive catalogue of his work was published in conjunction with his solo exhibition at Zurich Kunsthalle. Landers’s early years, from 1990 to 1995, were the subject of a monograph published by JRP|Ringier in 2011 to accompany his solo exhibition at Contemporary Art Museum St Louis.

Around the World Alone

For his exhibition Around the World Alone at Friedrich Petzel Gallery in 2011, Landers once again returned to the lonely clown in the boat from his 1996 painting, Alone. He used his long-term fascination with the Golden Globe race of 1968 as a point of departure. This race was the first solo round-the-world yacht race, in which nine men embarked from England; the frontrunner decided the race was irrelevant and turned around at the last moment to continue on around the world a second time (Bernard Moitessier), one contestant threw himself into the ocean (Donald Crowhurst) and only one man completed the race (Robin Knox-Johnston). It is hard not to realize that Landers at any one time could be any of these contestants. The paintings included in Around the World Alone depict the solo-circumnavigating sailor-clown ranging in age from young boy to old man. Punctuated by contemplative scenes, the hero can be seen progressing in age as he battles the ferocious seas and storms in his seaworthy boat S.V. Monos.

"Sean Landers" 
Sean Landers’ exhibition at Le Consortium - his first in France in over 20 years - offers a retrospective outlook on his pictorial work : about forty paintings created between 1993 and today, mostly from private collections, revisit the various series punctuating his artistic path.

Collections

Landers’s work is represented in numerous major museum and public collections including the Whitney Museum of American Art in New York, Los Angeles County Museum of Art, Walker Art Center in Minneapolis, Denver Art Museum, Seattle Art Museum, the Brooklyn Museum of Art, Tate Modern in London, Sammlung Hoffmann in Berlin, Sammlung Goetz in Munich, and Fundación/La Colección Jumex in Mexico, among others.

Personal life
Sean Landers lives in New York. He is married to Michelle Reyes Landers,  previously director at Andrea Rosen Gallery and The Felix Gonzalez-Torres Foundation.

References

Further reading

External links
 

1962 births
Living people
Artists from New York (state)
Artists from Pennsylvania
Artists from Massachusetts
University of the Arts (Philadelphia) alumni